Packraft and trail boat are colloquial terms for a small, portable inflatable boat designed for use in all bodies of water, including technical whitewater and ocean bays and fjords. A packraft is designed to be light enough to be carried for extended distances. Along with its propulsion system (collapsible paddles or lightweight oars) and safety equipment (PFD, clothing) the entire package is designed to be light and compact enough for an individual to negotiate rough terrain while carrying the rafting equipment together with supplies, shelter, and other survival or backcountry equipment. Modern packrafts vary from inexpensive vinyl boats lacking durability to sturdy craft costing over US $1,000. Most weigh less than 4 kg (9 lbs) and usually carry a single passenger. The most popular propulsion systems involve a kayak paddle that breaks down into two to five pieces. Most often they are paddled from a sitting position, although kneeling can be advantageous in some situations.

Pioneers

Pioneering use of packrafts is difficult to trace, as float tubes, inner tubes, and other small boats can in some of their uses be considered equivalent to packrafts, and have been used around the world for over a century, beginning with the Halkett boat. However, Dick Griffith is documented to have used a packraft to descend Copper Canyon's Urique River (Chihuahua, Mexico) in 1952 before introducing them to the Alaska Mountain Wilderness Classic adventure race in 1982. Packrafts are now common equipment in that race.
A variety of companies have made durable packrafts in the past including Sherpa, Curtis, and American Safety. Furthermore, aviator emergency rafts have been used for packrafting purposes in a variety of applications. Pioneering use of packrafts generally consisted of using boats intended as pool toys or lake craft in moving water while carrying gear or passengers. The discomfort of these non-durable boats led to the invention and marketing of the modern packraft.

Contemporary use
Alaska is generally considered the birthplace of packrafting as long distance, non-motorized, landscape travel across untracked wilderness necessitates a small, portable boat for water crossings. Dick Griffith, Roman Dial (author of Packrafting! An Introduction and How-to Guide), the Alaska Mountain Wilderness Classic, Sheri Tingey (founder of Alpacka Rafts), and Erin McKittrick (author of A Long Trek Home: 4,000 Miles by Boot, Raft and Ski), and her husband Bretwood Higman all are, or have been, based in Alaska. In the U.S. outside Alaska, Forrest McCarthy, Nathan Shoutis, and Ryan Jordan have advanced backcountry packrafting in Wyoming, Montana, Washington, Utah, and Arizona. Packrafting has become popular in Nordic countries and elsewhere in Europe. Packrafts have also been used in Mexico, Southeast Asia, Australia (including its Franklin River), New Zealand, Patagonia, and tropical South America. Typically the boats are carried to cross and float rivers, streams and lakes while carried between watersheds.

Packrafts have historically been used as portable boats for long distance wilderness travel, usage that reached its apogee in the Higman-McKittrick 7,200 km (4,500 mile) expedition along the Pacific Coast from Seattle to the Aleutian Islands. This classical use has been modified by most packraft owners to shorter day trips that mix trail hiking and river and creek floats or lake paddles. In Europe packrafts are used together with train travel. Most of these hike and paddle applications are in gentler water of Class II or less. However, low-flow steep creeks rated to Class V and other whitewater runs that were previously considered suitable only for kayaks and bigger rafts, are now run frequently by packrafters. The addition of spray decks and thigh straps allow more precise control of the craft. Eskimo rolling in packrafts is now done routinely. Packrafts are increasingly popular among fishers and hunters as well as travelers who wish to carry a lightweight craft on airplanes.

Characteristics

A typical cold water set-up including packraft with thigh straps and spray deck, safety lines, paddle, suitable clothing (such as a dry suit), inflation bag, helmet, backpack, dry bag weigh 7 kg (15 pounds). While they can be inflated by mouth or electric pumps, most contemporary users carry light weight inflation bags.

Distinction from "pool toy"
In this article, packrafts/trail boats are differentiated from pool toys or flotation devices, which are intended for use in an enclosed and controlled body of water, such as a swimming pool.  A packraft/trail boat is intended for use in open bodies of water.

Distinction from "man-portable" 
A packraft is distinguished from a strictly man-portable raft insofar as it is designed to be light enough to represent only a fraction of the total weight an individual can reasonably carry.  A packraft can be carried for extended periods, along with food, water, shelter, and other supplies that would enable the individual to traverse long distances through difficult terrain.  All rafts listed in this article weigh less than five pounds without paddles or spray decks.

Usage
Packrafts are used in a variety of applications.  These include:

River crossings
Whitewater (up to Class IV)
Remote lake fishing
Travel boats
Adventure racing
Open water crossings
Remote river descents
Hunting
Canyoneering
Aviator boats
Rock climbing Access

Slackrafting
The expense of high quality packrafts costing $US500 – $US1000 has led to interest in using PVC inflatable boats and even pool toys costing $US15 – $US100 as a cheap alternative. These vinyl substitutes are not designed for anything more challenging than boating on still water no further than an easy swim to shore; they puncture easily, and they do not inflate to high pressures. For these reasons they have been described as 'slackrafts'; they do, however, offer some advantages over the even cheaper option of Liloing.

Comparison of Packrafts

See also
 Coracle
 Kayak
 Canoe

References

External links
Video clips of a variety of whitewater packrafting
How-to video of Eskimo rolling a packraft
trailpeak.com: Alpacka pack raft opens up remote areas.
Pack rafting enter in balkan Area.

Sports in Alaska
Water sports equipment
Inflatable boats